Henry Swan may refer to:

 Henry Harrison Swan (1840–1916), U.S. federal judge
 Henry Swan (cricketer) (1879–1941), English cricketer and cricket administrator

See also
Henry Schwann (1868–1931), English first-class cricketer and stockbroker